Gypsonoma attrita is a species of moth of the family Tortricidae. It is found in Taiwan, Japan and the Russian Far East.

References

Moths described in 1965
Eucosmini